Behjerd may refer to:
Behjerd-e Bala
Behjerd-e Sofla